Huguley is a census-designated place (CDP) and unincorporated community in Chambers County, Alabama, United States. At the 2020 census, the population was 2,470.

Geography
Huguley is located in southeastern Chambers County at 32°50'16.811" North, 85°13'59.300" West (32.838003, -85.233139). It is bordered by the city of Lanett to the east and the city of Valley to the southeast.

Demographics

At the 2010 census, there were 2,540 people, 1,029 households and 707 families residing in the community. The racial makeup of the community was 73.0% White, 25.0% Black or African American, 0.6% Native American, 0.2% Asian, 0.4% from other races, and 0.7% from two or more races. 1.2% of the population were Hispanic or Latino of any race.

There were 1,029 households, of which 27.1% had children under the age of 18 living with them, 46.8% were married couples living together, 16.6% had a female householder with no husband present, and 31.3% were non-families. 28.2% of all households were made up of individuals, and 11.3% had someone living alone who was 65 years of age or older. The average household size was 2.47 and the average family size was 3.00.

23.8% of the population were under the age of 18, 7.9% from 18 to 24, 24.0% from 25 to 44, 28.8% from 45 to 64, and 15.4% who were 65 years of age or older. The median age was 40.6 years. For every 100 females, there were 94.8 males. For every 100 females age 18 and over, there were 97.8 males.

The median household income was $32,697 and the median family income was $46,813. Males had a median income of $33,938 compared with $35,461 for females. The per capita income was $17,886. About 9.9% of families and 10.7% of the population were below the poverty line, including 9.9% of those under age 18 and 13.3% of those age 65 or over.

Notable person
 Razzy Bailey, country music artist

References 

Unincorporated communities in Alabama
Census-designated places in Chambers County, Alabama
Census-designated places in Alabama
Unincorporated communities in Chambers County, Alabama